The 2012 UCI Mountain Bike Marathon World Championships was the 10th edition of the UCI Mountain Bike Marathon World Championships held in Ornans, France.

Medal summary

References

External links

UCI Mountain Bike World Championships
UCI Mountain Bike Marathon World Championships
2012 UCI Mountain Bike Marathon World Championships
UCI Mountain Bike Marathon World Championships